Torr Vale Mill is a Grade II* listed former cotton mill located in New Mills, Derbyshire, England on a small rocky outcrop at the bottom of the Torrs gorge in a bend of the River Goyt.

The mill was built in the late 1780s, by Daniel Strafford and was known as Stratford's mill. It was powered by two waterwheels to spin and weave cotton. It was rebuilt in 1856 and a steam engine was added. It continued to be driven by steam and water till the 1940s when electricity took over. It was still in use producing towelling products until December 2000, the longest continuous period of cotton production in the UK. Since 1998 there have been various plans by the new owner, Chemquip Ltd., to renovate and develop the mill. This is now well underway and the new events floor has been used extensively by the community for a wide range of events.. The Torr Vale Mill Preservation Trust in May 2001 and The Princes Regeneration Trust has also been seeking a solution.

In 2000 Torr Vale Mill was depicted on Royal Mail postage stamps to commemorate the Millennium Walkway in the Torrs Gorge. From this walkway, on the opposite side of the Gorge, dramatic views of the Mill may be had. In 2001 a fire destroyed one of the buildings of the mill. The mill remains in a lamentable state and, though now better secured, is at risk of further fire and vandalism. 
In 2010, Chad Bevan, a New Mills resident, won the Munro Trophy in the Derbyshire Open Arts Competition for his painting of the decaying Torr Vale Mill, the title being 'Lowes Mill'.

The Mill is on the English Heritage Heritage at Risk Register of Listed Buildings at risk through disuse and disrepair.
The local Heritage Centre Trust is actively engaged in trying to secure the future of this abandoned building.

References

Textile mills in Derbyshire
Cotton mills
History of the textile industry
Industrial Revolution in England
Textile mills completed in the 18th century
Grade II* listed buildings in Derbyshire
Grade II* listed industrial buildings
New Mills